Tarpeia is a crater on the asteroid 4 Vesta located at 69.5°S and 29°E, within the ridged and grooved terrain of Vesta's southern hemisphere. It has a diameter of 41 km. It is irregularly shaped and has a sharp, fresh rim. It contains many small craters less than a kilometer across and its steep slopes shows brilliant layers of minerals.

It was named after Tarpeia, a maiden from Roman mythology, on 27 December 2011.

References

Impact craters on asteroids
Surface features of 4 Vesta